MTK Budapest is a canoeing team based in Budapest, Hungary. MTK's canoeing section is composed of men and women teams.

Current squad

Technical and Managerial Staff
Canoeing team officials according to the official website:

Honours

Olympic medalists
The team's olympic medalists are shown below.

World Championships

European Championships

References

External links
 Official MTK website
 Club website

Sport in Budapest
Canoe clubs